Robert Black (2 December 1934 – 24 April 1984) was a Scottish professional footballer who played as an inside forward for Lugar Boswell Thistle, Kilmarnock, Ayr United and Corby Town.

References

1934 births
1984 deaths
Scottish footballers
Footballers from East Ayrshire
Lugar Boswell Thistle F.C. players
Kilmarnock F.C. players
Ayr United F.C. players
Corby Town F.C. players
Scottish Football League players
Scottish Football League representative players
Association football inside forwards